Kia Sara (also Romanized as Kīā Sarā) is a village in Lafmejan Rural District, in the Central District of Lahijan County, Gilan Province, Iran. At the 2006 census, its population was 321, in 105 families.

References 

Populated places in Lahijan County